Arvada Flour Mill, also known as Tiller's Moving & Storage, Inc. is a vacant flour mill in Arvada, Colorado, that is or was owned by Tiller's Moving & Storage, Inc.  It was listed on the National Register of Historic Places in 1975. The Arvada Historical Society owns the mill and provides tours of the Arvada Flour Mill Museum by appointment.

It is a three-story  building built in 1923 on a concrete and rock foundation, with a full basement, and with a protruding  office extension.  The machinery in the building was bought from another mill and hence is older.

See also
National Register of Historic Places listings in Jefferson County, Colorado

References

External links
Arvada Historical Society
National Register of Historical Places
Denver Post/YourHub article: Arvada Landmark To Be Restored

Industrial buildings completed in 1923
Buildings and structures in Arvada, Colorado
Grinding mills on the National Register of Historic Places in Colorado
Flour mills in the United States
Grinding mills in Colorado
Mill museums in Colorado
Museums in Jefferson County, Colorado
National Register of Historic Places in Jefferson County, Colorado
1923 establishments in Colorado